Enzo Viena (16 February 1933 - 25 November 2007) was an Argentine actor. He appeared in more than sixty films from 1958 to 2007. Destacó por su papel de Nino en la telenovela internacional del mismo nombre "Nino, las cosas simples de la vida" en 1971.

Selected filmography

References

External links 

1933 births
2007 deaths
Argentine male film actors